Riza may refer to:

 Riza Santos, Canadian television personality
 Riri Riza, Indonesian film director
 Reza (name), often spelled as Rıza
 Riza, South Khorasan, a village in South Khorasan Province, Iran
 Rijksinstituut voor Integraal Zoetwaterbeheer en Afvalwaterbehandeling, National Institute for Inland Water Management and Waste Water Treatment, part of Rijkswaterstaat